Leliter (also, Muerto) is a former settlement in Kern County, California. Leliter still appeared on maps as of 1943.

A post office operated at Leliter from 1910 to 1927.

References

Former settlements in Kern County, California
Former populated places in California